Molanna blenda is a species of hood casemaker in the family Molannidae. It is found in North America.

References

Integripalpia
Articles created by Qbugbot
Insects described in 1926